Storm Over Ceylon is a 1963 adventure film directed by Gerd Oswald and Giovanni Roccardi and starring Lex Barker, Ann Smyrner and Magali Noël. It was made as a co-production between West Germany, Italy and France.

It was shot at the Cinecitta Studios in Rome and on location in Sri Lanka.

Cast
 Lex Barker as Larry Stone
 Ann Smyrner as Helga Ferlach
 Magali Noël as Gaby
 Eleonora Rossi Drago as Maharani from Tungala
 Maurice Ronet as Dr. Gérard Rinaldi
 Franco Fabrizi as Manuel Da Costa
 Hans Nielsen as Professor Ferlach
 Peter Carsten as Hermann

References

Bibliography 
 Ivo Ritzer & Harald Steinwender. Transnationale Medienlandschaften: Populärer Film zwischen World Cinema und postkolonialem Europa. Springer-Verlag, 2016.

External links 
 

1963 films
1963 adventure films
German adventure films
French adventure films
Italian adventure films
West German films
1960s German-language films
Films directed by Gerd Oswald
Films set in Sri Lanka
Gloria Film films
1960s German films
1960s Italian films
1960s French films
German-language French films